caucasicum is a species name, "of the Caucasus." Some genera associated with this name are:

Flora
 Erythronium caucasicum, a bulbous perennial
 Rhododendron caucasicum, an alpine variety of rhododendron
 Sempervivum caucasicum, a succulent plant
 Symphytum caucasicum, an ornamental plant
 Trifolium caucasicum, a clover
 Tripleurospermum caucasicum, an aster

Fauna

Insects, arthropods
 Chrysotoxum caucasicum, a hoverfly
 Rhagium caucasicum, a beetle
 Sceliphron caucasicum, a wasp
 Xestobium caucasicum, a beetle
 Zodarion caucasicum, an ant-eating spider

Mammals
 Elasmotherium caucasicum, an extinct giant rhinoceros